Bitrig was an OpenBSD-based operating system targeted exclusively at the amd64 and armv7 platforms.

It is no longer being developed, and some of the work that it had done was merged back into OpenBSD. Some of its achievements included porting FUSE/puffs support, libc++ to the platform to replace libstdc++, PIE support for AMD64 and NDB kernel support.

Bitrig focused on using modern tools such as Git and LLVM/Clang along with only focusing on modern platforms.

It aimed to have a "commercially friendly code base", with texinfo being the only GNU tool in the base system. GPT partitioning was supported by Bitrig, and future plans included support for virtualisation and EFI.

References

OpenBSD
Software using the ISC license